Corsept is a commune in the Loire-Atlantique department in western France.

Etymology
It is believed that the name comes the Latin "Corpus Septimum" because it was the seventh parish on the banks of the Loire under the patronage of St. Martin.

Corsept is also the site of a number of Celtic dolmens and menhirs.

Population

Culture
Since 2000, Corsept has attracted music fans from around the world to the Couvre Feu music festival. In 2015, the festival organizers announced their intention to look for a new site for the festival citing scheduling conflicts.

The current mayor of Corsept has expressed an interest in resettling refugees in the commune, however appropriate housing will not be available until 2017.

See also
Communes of the Loire-Atlantique department

References

Communes of Loire-Atlantique